Fuchsina is a genus of beetles in the family Latridiidae, containing the following species:

 Fuchsina arida Andrews, 1976
 Fuchsina occulta Fall, 1899

References

Latridiidae genera